Squatting in Croatia has existed as a phenomenon since the decline of the Roman Empire. In the 1960s much private housing in major cities was illegally constructed or expanded and since the 1990s squatting is used as a tactic by feminists, punks and anarchists.

History 

At the end of the Roman Empire, when the city of Salona was sacked in 614 AD, its inhabitants fled to Diocletian's Palace nearby beside the sea. They squatted in the compound and their descendants have lived there ever since, resisting attacks from Pannonian Avars, Goths, Slavs, Tartars and the Ottoman Empire. The city of Split grew up around the palace. During the Croatian War of Independence (1991-1995), the peace movement was composed of squatters as well as anarchists, environmentalists and feminists.

In the 1960s, 39.5 per cent of all private housing in Zagreb was squatted, 49.3 per cent in Split and 66.8 per cent in Osijek. Squatting is criminalized by Articles 20-27 of the Croatian Ownership and other Proprietary Rights Act, and has become a form of subcultural activism in cities such as Zagreb from the 1990s onwards. 

In 1989, feminists organized through the Women's Group Tresnjevka squatted an apartment in Zagreb to shelter women escaping domestic violence.

Social centres 
AKC Medika in Zagreb is a social centre that has a bar, a music venue, galleries and office space for radical groups. The venue is called Attack and there is also a bicycle repair workshop, an infoshop and a film studio.
Nigdjezemska (Nowhereland) is a self-managed social centre in the part of the former military complex Stjepan Radić in Zadar. In 2019, the centre and the Menza skate park were threatened with eviction.

In Pula, the self-managed  is located in the former Military facilities Karlo Rojc. It was initially squatted by punks and then legalized. It provides rooms and ateliers for over 100 groups and has a hacklab and a music venue. Since 1999, Rojc has hosted the annual Monteparadiso punk music festival which began seven years earlier in the squatted .

See also 
 Squatting in Serbia
Squatting in Slovenia

References 

Croatia
History of Croatia